Komárom county (in Latin: comitatus Comaromiensis, in Hungarian: Komárom (vár)megye, in Slovak: Komárňanský komitát / Komárňanská stolica / Komárňanská župa,  in German: Komorner Gespanschaft / Komitat Komorn) was an administrative county (comitatus) of the Kingdom of Hungary, situated on both sides of the Danube river. Today, the territory to the north of the Danube is part of Slovakia, while the territory to the south of the Danube is part of Hungary.

Geography

The rivers Danube Vág and Nyitra ran through the county. It also covered the eastern part of the island between the Danube and the Little Danube (Slovak  translates as English: Rye Island,).

Capitals
The capital of the county was the Komárom Castle and later the town of Komárom (the town was divided into Komárom-Komárno).

History
The Komárom comitatus arose in the 11th century as one of the first comitatuses of the Kingdom of Hungary. It was situated within a radius of about 20 km around Komárom.

In 1920 the Treaty of Trianon assigned the part of Komárom county north of the Danube to Czechoslovakia (Komárno region). The southern part stayed in Hungary and merged with the southern part of Esztergom county to form Komárom-Esztergom County in 1923. The forming of Czechoslovakia, whose border in the south became the Danube River, separated the seat of the county, Komárom, from its southern half. 

In 1938, the Czechoslovak part became part of Hungary by the First Vienna Award. Komárom county was recreated, which included, besides the territory of pre-1920 Komárom County, most of the Rye Island. After World War II, the pre-war situation was reestablished, but in 1950, the county was renamed to Komárom as the county was rearranged and received some extra territories. This county was renamed to Komárom-Esztergom County in 1990. The part of the former county north of the river Danube is now in Slovakia, is part of the Nitra region and is largely identical with the Komárno district.

The territory to the north of the Danube is part of Slovakia (Nitra region) and is largely identical with the Komárno district. The territory to the south of the Danube is part of Hungary. The town on the northern shore was renamed to Komárno. Komárno and Komárom are today connected by the Elisabeth Bridge.

Demographics

In 1900, the county had a population of 180,024 people and was composed of the following linguistic communities:

Total:

 Hungarian: 155,850 (86.6%)
 German: 12,439 (6.9%)
 Slovak: 10,012 (5.6%)
 Croatian: 144 (0.0%)
 Romanian: 52 (0.0%)
 Serbian: 22 (0.0%)
 Ruthenian: 19 (0.0%)
 Other or unknown: 1,486 (0.8%)

According to the census of 1900, the county was composed of the following religious communities:

Total:

 Roman Catholic: 118,513 (65.8%)
 Calvinist: 48,618 (27.0%)
 Jewish: 7,235 (4.0%)
 Lutheran: 5,376 (3.0%)
 Greek Catholic: 189 (0.1%)
 Greek Orthodox: 53 (0.0%)
 Unitarian: 9 (0.0%)
 Other or unknown: 31 (0.0%)

Subdivisions

In the early 20th century, the subdivisions of Komárom county were:

Komárno, Zemianska Olča, Dvory nad Žitavou and Hurbanovo are now in Slovakia.

References

States and territories established in 1790
States and territories established in 1938
1786 disestablishments
States and territories disestablished in 1920
States and territories disestablished in 1923
States and territories disestablished in 1945
Counties in the Kingdom of Hungary
Divided regions